Experimental Techniques is an official journal of the Society for Experimental Mechanics and was established in 1975. The journal is  published by Springer Nature and the editor-in-chief is Bonnie Antoun (Sandia National Laboratories).

Abstracting and indexing 
The journal is abstracted and indexed in:

According to the Journal Citation Reports, the journal has a 2020 impact factor of 1.167.

References

External links 

 

English-language journals
Materials science journals
Springer Science+Business Media academic journals
Publications established in 1975
Bimonthly journals